State of Sarawak Stadium (Stadium Negeri Sarawak in Malay) is a multi-purpose stadium in Kuching, Sarawak, Malaysia. It is currently used mostly for football matches. The stadium holds 26,000 people and opened in 1989, was the largest stadium in Malaysia. The stadium hosted Sukma Games in 1990, which Sarawak won. State Stadium is located in an area of 5 hectares in Petra Jaya. Officially opened on 27 August 1983. 3 stages of construction experience. The second stage of construction was completed on 15 June 1989 while the third level with the addition of a block to be completed by 24 June 1991. The total cost of this State Stadium is RM22.6 million. The stadium can accommodate 26,000 spectators at a time. Apart from sport and football, the stadium can also be a venue for organizing the rally events, concerts, performances, meetings, courses, workshops and so on.

The stadium has been used to host Sarawak FA home matches. The stadium is adjacent to the new stadium, the Sarawak Stadium. The Stadium has its own magical spirit for The 'Ngap Sayot' Team as for the record, in 2013 season, Sarawak only lost once to Kelantan in Malaysia FA Cup and draw twice to Sabah in Premier League match and Pahang in the most memorable night of Semi Final Malaysia Cup.

References 

Football venues in Malaysia
Athletics (track and field) venues in Malaysia
Multi-purpose stadiums in Malaysia
Sports venues in Sarawak
Buildings and structures in Kuching
Tourist attractions in Kuching
1991 establishments in Malaysia
Sports venues completed in 1991